The 2022 Virginia is for Racing Lovers 150  was an NASCAR Whelen Modified Tour race that was held on April 1, 2022. It was contested over 150 laps on the  oval. It was the 2nd race of the 2022 NASCAR Whelen Modified Tour season. Justin Bonsignore collected his first victory of the season.

Report

Entry list 

 (R) denotes rookie driver.
 (i) denotes driver who is ineligible for series driver points.

Practice

Qualifying

Qualifying results

Race 

Laps: 150

Race statistics 

 Lead changes:  8
 Cautions/Laps: 5 for 29 laps
 Time of race: 1:16:40
 Average speed: 88.043 mph

References 

2022 NASCAR Whelen Modified Tour
Virginia is for Racing Lovers 150
Virginia is for Racing Lovers 150